Ye-jun is a Korean masculine given name. There are 34 hanja with the reading "ye" and 34 hanja with the reading "jun" on the South Korean government's official list of hanja which may be used in given names. It was the seventh-most popular name for newborn boys in South Korea in 2008, rising to sixth place in 2009 and remaining at sixth place in 2015.

See also
List of Korean given names

References

Korean masculine given names